José Jackson Mina Borja (born 4 March 1993) is an Ecuadorian football midfielder who plays for Peruvian club Unión Huaral.

Career
Mina was with Barcelona SC U20 team until 2009. Same year, he played for CS Norte América. Then, from 2009 to 2010 Independiente del Valle U20 team, and later in 2010 for CD Municipal Cañar U20, and CS Norte América, again. From 2010 to 2011, he was with Independiente del Valle U20 for the second time, and from 2011 to 2012 he returned in CS Norte América the third time. He played for B team of CD El Nacional from 2013 to 2014, and B team of CD Universidad Católica from 2013 to 2014. In 2014, he made 6 appearances for CD El Nacional.

In winter break off-season 2014–15, he arrived in Novi Pazar, together with José Gutiérrez.

After playing half-season in Serbia, in summer 2015 he moved to Uruguay and played one season with Plaza Colonia in the 2015–16 Uruguayan Primera División season. Following summer he returned to Ecuador and joined Guayaquil S.C.

References

External links
 José Mina stats at utakmica.rs 
 

1993 births
Living people
Sportspeople from Esmeraldas, Ecuador
Association football midfielders
Ecuadorian footballers
C.D. El Nacional footballers
FK Novi Pazar players
Ecuadorian expatriate footballers
Ecuadorian expatriate sportspeople in Serbia
Expatriate footballers in Serbia
Ecuadorian expatriate sportspeople in Uruguay
Expatriate footballers in Uruguay
Ecuadorian expatriate sportspeople in Peru
Expatriate footballers in Peru
Serbian SuperLiga players
C.S. Norte América footballers